

52001–52100 

|-id=005
| 52005 Maik ||  || Maik Meyer (born 1970), German amateur astronomer || 
|-id=008
| 52008 Johnnaka ||  || John Yoshio Naka (1914–2004), the preeminent American bonsai master of the late 20th century. || 
|-id=030
| 52030 Maxvasile ||  || Massimiliano Vasile (born 1970) is a professor of Space Systems Engineering at the University of Strathclyde. He has developed innovative techniques for the design and optimization of space trajectories and is an astrodynamics expert. He is leader of the EuTN STARDUST project on asteroid and space debris monitoring and mitigation.. || 
|-id=057
| 52057 Clarkhowell ||  || Francis Clark Howell (1925–2007), generally known as "F. Clark Howell", was an American anthropologist. || 
|}

52101–52200 

|-bgcolor=#f2f2f2
| colspan=4 align=center | 
|}

52201–52300 

|-id=225
| 52225 Panchenko ||  || Vladislav Yakovlevich Panchenko (born 1947), an authority in laser information technologies, scientific instrumentation technologies, non-linear optics and medical physics. || 
|-id=226
| 52226 Saenredam || 1974 PA || Pieter Jansz. Saenredam (1597–1665), Dutch Baroque-era painter and engraver || 
|-id=228
| 52228 Protos || 1977 RN || Greek word for "first", the discoverer's first minor planet detection || 
|-id=231
| 52231 Sitnik ||  || Grigorij Fedorovich Sitnik (1911–1996), professor of the Moscow State University. || 
|-id=242
| 52242 Michelemaoret || 1981 EX || Michele Maoret (born 1971), a mathematics teacher and president of the association of scientific education 'Luigi Lagrange', which is involved in the teaching of physics, mathematics and astronomy. || 
|-id=246
| 52246 Donaldjohanson ||  || Donald Johanson (born 1943), an American paleoanthropologist who discovered the fossil of a female hominin australopithecine known as "Lucy". || 
|-id=260
| 52260 Ureshino || 1982 KA || Ureshino, a city located in Saga prefecture, Kyushu island, Japan || 
|-id=261
| 52261 Izumishikibu ||  || Izumi Shikibu (born c. 976) was a Japanese poet from the 11th century Heian period. She wrote Izumi Shikibu Nikki, which was a notable diary containing waka poems about her affairs with the Imperial Prince. It is said that she was born in Shiroishi district and spent her younger days in Shiota in Saga Prefecture, Japan. || 
|-id=266
| 52266 Van Flandern || 1986 AD || Tom Van Flandern (1940–2009), astronomer and lunar occultations analylist at the U.S. Naval Observatory in the 1970s || 
|-id=267
| 52267 Rotarytorino ||  || The "Rotary Club Torino", the third oldest Rotary Club in Italy and from its foundation in 1925 has contributed with its services to the development of science and technology, the most important enterprises in the Piedmont scientific and industrial area. || 
|-id=270
| 52270 Noamchomsky ||  || Noam Chomsky (born 1928), an American linguist and philosopher. || 
|-id=271
| 52271 Lecorbusier ||  || Le Corbusier (Charles-Edouard Jeanneret, 1887–1965), Swiss-French architect and city planner || 
|-id=285
| 52285 Kakurinji ||  || Kakurinji, built by Prince Shotoku in AD 589, is a historically significant Buddhist temple complex in Kakogawa city, Hyogo prefecture. || 
|-id=291
| 52291 Mott ||  || John R. Mott (1865–1955), American organizer of the modern ecumenical movement and Peace Prize Nobelist || 
|-id=292
| 52292 Kamdzhalov ||  || Yordan Kamdzhalov (born 1980), Bulgarian conductor. || 
|-id=293
| 52293 Mommsen ||  || Theodor Mommsen (1817–1903), German classical historian, epigraphist, and Nobelist || 
|-id=294
| 52294 Detlef ||  || Detlef Ninnemann (born 1944), a German patent attorney and electrical engineer. || 
|-id=295
| 52295 Köppen ||  || Wladimir Köppen (1846–1940), a Russian-German botanist-climatologist. || 
|}

52301–52400 

|-
| 52301 Qumran ||  || Qumran, Palestine, where the Dead Sea Scrolls were found || 
|-id=308
| 52308 Hanspeterröser ||  || Hans-Peter Röser (born 1949), director of the Institute of Space Studies at the University of Stuttgart. || 
|-id=309
| 52309 Philnicolai ||  || Philipp Nicolai, German Lutheran pastor and poet, author of the hymns Wachet auf, ruft uns die Stimme (Wake, awake! for night is flying) and Wie schön leuchtet der Morgenstern (How brightly beams the morning star!) || 
|-id=316
| 52316 Daveslater || 1992 BD || David C. Slater (1957–2011), a U.S. physicist with Southwest Research Institute. || 
|-id=334
| 52334 Oberammergau ||  || Oberammergau, Bavaria, Germany, festival place of a famous Passion Play || 
|-id=337
| 52337 Compton || 1992 RS || Arthur Holly Compton, American physicist and Nobelist || 
|-id=341
| 52341 Ballmann ||  || Helga Ballmann (born 1954), the personal assistant of the Director of the Astronomisches Rechen-Institut, Heidelberg.  || 
|-id=344
| 52344 Yehudimenuhin ||  || Yehudi Menuhin (1916–1999), an American-born violinist and conductor, is considered one of the greatest violinists of the 20th century. || 
|-id=384
| 52384 Elenapanko ||  || Elena Alekseevna Panko (born 1958), a Ukrainian astronomer at Nikolaev State University || 
|-id=387
| 52387 Huitzilopochtli ||  || Huitzilopochtli is an Aztec god associated with the sun. His name, meaning "hummingbird of the south" came from the Aztec belief that the spirits of killed warriors followed the sun through the sky during four subsequent years. Thereafter they were transformed into hummingbirds. || 
|}

52401–52500 

|-id=421
| 52421 Daihoji || 1994 LA || Daihōji, north of Kumakōgen, Japan, 44th destination of the Shikoku Pilgrimage || 
|-id=422
| 52422 LPL || 1994 LP || The University of Arizona's Lunar and Planetary Laboratory || 
|-id=455
| 52455 Masamika ||  || Masa-aki Takanashi (1959–2001) and his wife Mika, Japanese amateur astronomers || 
|-id=457
| 52457 Enquist ||  || Anna Enquist (born 1945), a Dutch author and poet, who studied psycho-analysis at Leiden and piano at the conservatory of Den Haag. || 
|-id=480
| 52480 Enzomora ||  || Gian Vincenzo Mora, Italian amateur astronomer || 
|-id=487
| 52487 Huazhongkejida ||  || The Chinese Huazhong University of Science and Technology (Huazhongkejida or HUST) is a research university located in Wuhan, Hubei province. It was the first university in central China to establish an Astronomy Department. || 
|-id=500
| 52500 Kanata ||  || KANATA, Japanese for "Far Away", name of the new 1.5-m telescope of Hiroshima University || 
|}

52501–52600 

|-id=558
| 52558 Pigafetta || 1997 FR || Antonio Pigafetta (c. 1492—c. 1531) was an Italian navigator and geographer. He participated in the first circumnavigation of the globe from 1519 to 1522. || 
|-id=570
| 52570 Lauraco ||  || Laura Colombini (born 1986), a European Languages and Cultures graduate of the University of Modena, is the first daughter of one of the co-discoverers of this minor planet. || 
|-id=589
| 52589 Montviloff ||  || Nicolas Montviloff, French co-founder of the Observatoire des Pises, and current president of the Société astronomique de Montpellier || 
|}

52601–52700 

|-
| 52601 Iwayaji ||  || , east of Kumakōgen, Japan, 45th destination of the Shikoku Pilgrimage || 
|-id=604
| 52604 Thomayer ||  || Josef Thomayer (1853–1927), Czech professor of internal medicine at the Charles University of Prague || 
|-id=633
| 52633 Turvey ||  || Barry Sydney Turvey (born 1950) has devoted many years to the cause of popularizing astronomy in the UK, as Membership Secretary, Merchandising Manager and Council Member of the Society for Popular Astronomy. || 
|-id=649
| 52649 Chrismith ||  || Christine Elizabeth Smith, American elementary school teacher || 
|-id=665
| 52665 Brianmay ||  || Brian May, British astrophysicist, chancellor of Liverpool John Moores University, and lead guitarist and songwriter for the rock group Queen || 
|-id=670
| 52670 Alby ||  || Alberto ("Alby") Colombini (born 1989) is a graduate accountant, employed in a transport company, and an amateur soccer player. He is the second son of one of the co-discoverers of this minor planet. || 
|-id=681
| 52681 Kelleghan ||  || Deirdre Kelleghan (born 1957) is an Irish astronomer, artist and educator. She invents, designs and enacts creative workshops to help children understand our solar system through drawing. Her activities take place in schools, libraries, science centres and observatories throughout Ireland. || 
|}

52701–52800 

|-id=767
| 52767 Ophelestes ||  || Ophelestes, a Trojan warrior, was killed by an arrow of Teucer, who was causing much havoc with his bow amongst the ranks of the Trojans. || 
|}

52801–52900 

|-id=872
| 52872 Okyrhoe ||  || Okyrhoe, mythological daughter of Chiron and Chariklo || 
|}

52901–53000 

|-id=963
| 52963 Vercingetorix ||  || Vercingetorix (ca. 82 BC – 46 BC) was a King of the Arverni and military leader of the Celtic people against the Roman invasion. He beat Julius Caesar's forces at the Battle of Gergovia (52 BCE), but surrendered during the battle of Alesia, presumably because of superstitions related to the lunar eclipse of 26 Sep. 52 BCE. || 
|-id=975
| 52975 Cyllarus ||  || Cyllarus, mythological centaur || 
|}

References 

052001-053000